Tijani Ould Kerim (Born 13 December 1951, in Mederdra, Mauritania) is a Mauritania teacher and diplomat.

Early life 

Kerim graduated from Sorbonne University in Paris in 1976.

Career 

His first career path was to become a teacher. Later he was president of the  Mauritanian Youth organisation (JPPM) and High Commissioner for Youth (Junior Minister) under President Mokhtar Ould Daddah, between 1977 and 1978. He became a Member of Parliament, between 1992 and 1996. He then became the Mauritanian diplomat to Gambia, from 1996 to 1999. After this he became the ambassador to the Ivory Coast from 1999 to 2002, to Canada from 2002 to 2004 and to the USA from 2004.

References

1951 births
Living people
University of Paris alumni
Mauritanian diplomats
People from Trarza Region